The 2015 ATP Challenger Torino was a professional tennis tournament played on clay courts. It was the first edition of the tournament which was part of the 2015 ATP Challenger Tour. It took place in Turin, Italy between 27 April and 3 May.

Singles main-draw entrants

Seeds

 1 Rankings are as of April 20, 2015

Other entrants
The following players received wildcards into the singles main draw:
  Matteo Donati
  Stefano Napolitano
  Gianluigi Quinzi
  Lorenzo Sonego

The following players received entry from the qualifying draw:
  Karen Khachanov
  Maxime Hamou
  Gianluca Naso
  Edoardo Eremin

Champions

Singles

 Marco Cecchinato def.  Kimmer Coppejans, 6–2, 6–3

Doubles

 Wesley Koolhof /  Matwé Middelkoop def.  Dino Marcan /  Antonio Šančić, 4–6, 6–3, [10–5]

References
 Combo Main Draw

ATP Challenger Torino
ATP Challenger Torino